Alfonso Márquez de la Plata Yrarrázaval (19 July 1933 – 22 April 2014) was a Chilean politician, businessman and writer. He was Minister of Agriculture from 1977 until 1980. He was later the Ministry General Secretariat of Government from 1983 to 1984. He was born in Santiago.

Márquez died from pneumonia on 22 April 2014 in Santiago. He was 80.

References

1933 births
2014 deaths
People from Santiago
Chilean people of Spanish descent
Ministers of Agriculture of Chile
Chilean businesspeople
Chilean male writers
Pontifical Catholic University of Chile alumni
Deaths from pneumonia in Chile
Chilean Ministers Secretary General of Government